This article lists the heads of state of Zimbabwe from the Unilateral Declaration of Independence (UDI) of Rhodesia in 1965 to the present day.

From 1965 to 1970 the head of state under the UDI was the Monarch in person of Elizabeth II, who simultaneously reigned as the Monarch of the United Kingdom and the other Commonwealth realms.

Ian Smith's government continued to affirm allegiance to Elizabeth II as Queen of Rhodesia from the UDI until 1970, but this was not acknowledged by the international community.

The 'Monarch' was represented in Rhodesia by the Officer Administrating of the Government, because Smith and his cabinet ignored Sir Humphrey Gibbs the Governor of Southern Rhodesia.

Rhodesia became a republic under the Constitution of 1969, adopted following the 1969 constitutional referendum, and the 'Monarch' and Officer Administrating of the Government were replaced by a ceremonial President.

Background
Initially, the territory was referred to as "South Zambezia", a reference to the River Zambezi, until the name "Rhodesia" came into use in 1895. This was in honour of Cecil Rhodes, the British empire-builder and key figure during the British expansion into southern Africa. The British government agreed that Rhodes' company, the British South Africa Company (BSAC), would administer the territory stretching from the Limpopo to Lake Tanganyika under charter as a protectorate. Queen Victoria signed the charter in 1889. 
The territory north of the Zambezi was the subject of separate treaties with African chiefs: today, it forms the country of Zambia. The designation "Southern Rhodesia" was first used officially in 1898 in the Southern Rhodesia Order in Council of 20 October 1898, which applied to the area south of the Zambezi, and was more common after the BSAC merged the administration of the two northern territories as Northern Rhodesia in 1911.

Unrecognised monarchy (19651970)

On 7 October 1964 the Southern Rhodesian government announced that when Northern Rhodesia achieved independence as Zambia, the Southern Rhodesian government would officially become known as the Rhodesian Government and the colony would become known as Rhodesia. On 23 October of that year, the Minister of Internal Affairs notified the Press that the Constitution would be amended to make this official. The Legislative Assembly then passed an Interpretation Bill to declare that the colony could be referred to as Rhodesia. The Bill received its third reading on 9 December 1964, and passed to the Governor for assent.

On 11 November 1965, following a brief but solemn consensus, Rhodesia's leading statesmen issued their country's Unilateral Declaration of Independence (UDI). This was immediately denounced as an "act of rebellion against the Crown" in the United Kingdom, and Prime Minister Harold Wilson promised that the illegal action would be short-lived. Initially, the state retained its pledged loyalty to Elizabeth II, Queen of the United Kingdom, recognizing her as Queen of Rhodesia. However, few seemed to initially realize that Rhodesia was no longer within the Commonwealth's direct sphere of influence and British rule was now a constitutional fiction; Salisbury remained virtually immune to credible metropolitan leverage.

The monarch's powers were the same as prior to the Unilateral Declaration of Independence. However they were de facto exercised by the Officer Administering the Government (Clifford Dupont) as the Queen's de jure representative.

Republic of Rhodesia (19701979)
During a two-proposition referendum held in 1969, the proposal for severing all remaining ties to The Crown passed by a majority of 61,130 votes to 14,327. Rhodesia declared itself a republic on 2 March 1970.

Under the 1969 Constitution, the first constitution of the Republic of Rhodesia, the President replaced the monarch as ceremonial head of state. The President was elected by Parliament. In the event of a vacancy the President of the Senate served as Acting President.

Zimbabwe Rhodesia (1979)
Under pressure from the international community to satisfy the civil rights movement by Blacks in Rhodesia, an "Internal Settlement" was drawn up between the Ian Smith administration of Rhodesia and moderate African nationalist parties not involved in armed resistance. Meanwhile, the government continued to battle armed resistance from both Soviet and Chinese backed Marxist liberation movements it referred to as "terrorists"- the Rhodesian Bush War was an extension of the Cold War, being a proxy conflict between the West and East, similar to those in Vietnam and Korea.

The "Internal Settlement" agreement led to relaxation of education, property and income qualifications for voter rolls, resulting in the first ever Black majority electorate. The country's civil service, judiciary, police and armed forces continued to be administered by the same officials as before, of whom most were Whites, due to the composition of the upper-middle class of the period.

The Lancaster House Agreement stipulated that control over the country be returned to the United Kingdom in preparation for elections to be held in the spring of 1980. From 12 December 1979 to 17 April 1980, Zimbabwe Rhodesia was again the British colony of Southern Rhodesia. On 18 April 1980, Southern Rhodesia became the independent Republic of Zimbabwe.

Zimbabwe (1980present)

Notes

Timeline

External links

World Statesmen – Zimbabwe

Government of Zimbabwe
H

Zimbabwe